Anolis pulchellus, the Puerto Rican bush anole,  snake anole, or Puerto Rican anole, is a small anole lizard of the family Dactyloidae. The species is among the most common lizards in Puerto Rico, and also native to Vieques, Culebra, and the Virgin Islands (except St. Croix).

The species has a yellow-brown color with males having a purple dewlap that blends into crimson near the tip.

The anoles of the Greater Antilles have been extensively studied since they represent an interesting case of adaptive radiation. Species are more closely related to other species within the same island than to species of adjacent islands. Even though species divergence occurred independently on each island, the same set of ecomorphs (habitat specialists) have evolved on each island. Anolis pulchellus is considered a grass-bush anole, occurring primarily in bushes or grass.

See also

Fauna of Puerto Rico
List of amphibians and reptiles of Puerto Rico

References

Anoles
Reptiles of Puerto Rico
Reptiles described in 1837
Taxa named by André Marie Constant Duméril
Taxa named by Gabriel Bibron